Wittelbee Conservation Park, formerly the  Wittelbee National Park, is a protected area in the Australian state of South Australia  located on the west coast of Eyre Peninsula in adjoining the headland of Wittelbee Point about  south east of the town of Ceduna.   

The conservation park consists of the following land in the cadastral unit of the Hundred of Bonython - section 101 and a parcel of land identified as Allotment 1 of Deposited Plan No. 31612. The land in section 101 first acquired protected area status as a national park declared on 16 January 1969 under the National Parks Act 1966. On 27 April 1972, the national park was reconstituted as the Wittelbee Conservation Park under the National Parks and Wildlife Act 1972. On 19 December 1991, additional land, i.e. Allotment 1 of Deposited Plan No. 31612, was added to the conservation park to extend protection over land located between high tide and low tide.

The following statement of significance was published in 1980: The park is significant as it contains an area of samphire swamp which is not well represented in the National Parks system.  Wittelbee Conservation Park contains mallee vegetation right up to the coastal dune, fine sandy beaches and a low rocky headland.  A pleasant picnicking area is utilised by the local residents and tourists.

The conservation park is categorised as an IUCN Category III protected area.   In 1980, it was listed on the now-defunct Register of the National Estate.

References

External links
Wittelbee Conservation Park official webpage
Parks of the Far West official brochure
Wittelbee Conservation Park on protected planet

Conservation parks of South Australia
Protected areas established in 1969
1969 establishments in Australia
South Australian places listed on the defunct Register of the National Estate